Salmo kottelati is a species of trout endemic to the Alakır Stream of Antalya Province in southern Turkey. It was previously considered part of Salmo macrostigma (Salmo trutta macrostigma).

Etymology
The fish is named in honor of Swiss ichthyologist Maurice Kottelat (b. 1957), because of his contributions to our knowledge of European and Asian fishes.

References

kottelati
Endemic fauna of Turkey
Fish of Turkey
Taxa named by Davut Turan
Fish described in 2014